Centalun was developed by Boehringer Ingelheim in 1962 and is a psycholeptic drug with hypnotic and sedative effects, via allosteric agonism of the GABAA receptor. It was previously used for sedation in medical procedures such as surgery, orthopedics and gynecology, although it is no longer in clinical use. Despite its history of clinical use, centalun was never incorporated into the CSA and therefore remains unregulated as a drug of abuse.

References 

Hypnotics
GABAA receptor positive allosteric modulators
Alkyne derivatives
Vicinal diols
Phenyl compounds